Hello Counselor was a South Korean social commentary talk show that debuted on November 22, 2010. It was hosted by Shin Dong-yup, Lee Young-ja, and Cultwo (Jung Chan-woo, Kim Tae-gyun). Choi Tae-joon joined the show as host from August 29, 2016 to September 4, 2017. After 8 years as host, Jung Chan-woo has left the show after the broadcast of April 23, 2018 due to health problems.

According to the show's official description through KBS, Hello Counselor is a talk show with an emphasis on regular people, regardless of age or gender, that aims to help take down communication barriers by sharing stories about life. The program airs a new episode every Monday on KBS2, and re-airs it with English subtitles on KBS World a week later in the same time frame.

The final episode of the series aired on September 30, 2019.

Episodes

2010–2011

2012

2013

2014

2015

2016

2017

2018

2019

Four Helpers

In January 2016, KBS threatened legal action against Shanghai Media Group for their show Four Helpers (四大名助), claiming that the show plagiarized Hello Counselor's set design, format, voting and scoring system, and other aspects of the show. A statement issued by KBS stated that they had demanded the immediate termination of the show's broadcast on the grounds publication right infringement and that, if the broadcasts continued, they would involve the Chinese State Administration of Press, Publication, Radio, Film and Television and pursue legal action.

Awards and nominations

References

External links
 
 

Korean-language television shows
South Korean television talk shows
South Korean variety television shows
2011 South Korean television series debuts
2019 South Korean television series endings
2010s South Korean television series
Korean Broadcasting System original programming